Epicenter is a public art work by artist Ernest Carl Shaw located at the Lynden Sculpture Garden near Milwaukee, Wisconsin. The sculpture is an abstract form made of several steel bars set at angles; it is rust-colored and installed on the lawn.

See also
 III Columns

References

Outdoor sculptures in Milwaukee
1976 sculptures
Steel sculptures in Wisconsin
1976 establishments in Wisconsin